The Cantons of Le Havre are cantons situated in the Seine-Maritime département and in the Normandy region of northern France. Since the French canton reorganisation which came into effect in March 2015, the commune of Le Havre is subdivided into 6 cantons, some of which also contain other communes:
Canton of Le Havre-1 (pop. 37,768)
Canton of Le Havre-2 (pop. 35,420, also includes Harfleur and Montivilliers)
Canton of Le Havre-3 (pop. 37,580, also includes Gainneville, Gonfreville-l'Orcher and Rogerville)
Canton of Le Havre-4 (pop. 37,107)
Canton of Le Havre-5 (pop. 32,874)
Canton of Le Havre-6 (pop. 37,335, also includes Sainte-Adresse)

See also 
 Arrondissements of the Seine-Maritime department
 Cantons of the Seine-Maritime department
 Communes of Seine-Maritime

References

Le Havre
Le Havre